The 3rd Estonian SS Volunteer Brigade was a formation of the German Waffen-SS during World War II. It was formed in May 1943, when the Estonian SS Legion  (Estnische SS-Legion) was upgraded. The first name chosen for the brigade was the Estonian SS Volunteer Brigade, until October 1943, when all SS brigades were numbered so it finally became the 3rd Estonian Volunteer Brigade. The brigade was expanded to a division and renamed on January 23, 1944.

Service history
The Estonian SS Legion had by April 1943, increased its numbers enough to form a brigade-sized formation and was even able to dispatch a battalion, the Narva Battalion, to the SS Division Wiking to replace the departing Finnish Battalion whose members had come to the end of their contracts.
The new 3rd Estonian SS Volunteer Brigade had by November 1943, 5,099 men and was ready for active service.

In October the brigade was first allocated anti-partisan duties in northern Belarus. At the end of October, the Red Army broke through the German lines after intense fighting in the nearby Nevel section of the front. Since the German command had no reserves in the area, the Estonian Brigade was transferred to the front line where it pushed the Soviet forces back 5-15 kilometers by 13 November.

The Brigade was put under command of the VIII Corps of Army Group North. The brigade suffered severe losses fighting against numerous Red Army assaults and was eventually forced back to Opochka and transferred to the I Army Corps. It was then decided to create an Estonian Division and use the Brigade to form the cadre of the 20th Waffen Grenadier Division der SS (Estonian Number 1).

The brigade was expanded to a division and renamed the 20th Estonian SS Volunteer Division on January 23, 1944. It was returned to Estonia after the general conscription call where it was reformed into the 20th Waffen Grenadier Division of the SS (1st Estonian) established on May 26, 1944, when it absorbed all the other Estonian formations in the German military and some Estonian police units. The Finnish Infantry Regiment 200 was also assimilated.

Commander

Obersturmbannführer Franz Augsberger (22 October 1943 – 21 January 1944)

References

Security units of Nazi Germany established in 1943
0*03
Military history of Estonia during World War II
Foreign conscript units of the Waffen-SS
Generalbezirk Estland
Security units of Nazi Germany disestablished in 1944